Saint-Aignan-Grandlieu (Gallo: Saent-Aenyan-Graund-Loe) is a commune in the Loire-Atlantique department in the administrative region of Pays de la Loire, France.

Population

See also
Communes of the Loire-Atlantique department

References

Communes of Loire-Atlantique